San Siro Stables, also known as Scuderie De Montel, were built in Milan between 1914 and 1924 by De Montel, a Jewish Milanese aristocrat. In 1938, following the application of racial laws in Italy, the government took possession of the buildings.

Recent developments
In 2006 Consorzio Stabile SPA, a conglomerate made of local building companies won the public tender issued by the City Council of Milan to rebuild the baths of Milan on the grounds of the former San Siro stables. The project was later abandoned by the same city government that launched it.

References 

Buildings and structures completed in the 20th century
Buildings and structures in Milan